Cheakamus is an anglicization of Chiyakmesh, the Skwxw7mesh language name for one of their villages, now located on Cheakamus Indian Reserve No. 11.

Cheakamus may also refer to:
Cheakamus River
Cheakamus Lake  
Cheakamus Powerhouse, on the Squamish River
Cheakamus (ship), see Union Steamship Company of British Columbia